Strange Too – Another Violation by Anton Corbijn is the third music video compilation by Depeche Mode, featuring more videos directed by Anton Corbijn, released in 1990.

Unlike the previous video, Strange, all the videos are fully in color. There are six videos, all songs from the album Violator, released in the same year. There is one for each of the four singles, plus two bonus videos, for "Halo" and "Clean", exclusive to "Strange Too".

As with its predecessor, Corbijn shot all six videos in Super-8. The taller woman in the "Halo" video is a young Jenna Elfman. The Drive-In featured in the introduction to the compilation is the "Motor Vu Drive-In", located in Erda, Utah, west of Salt Lake City, near the town of Tooele. This part of the video was shot the day after the band's concert in Salt Lake City in July 1990.

Videos

VHS: Mute Film – MF003 (UK) / LD (CLV): Sire – 38181-6 (US)
 "Personal Jesus"
 "Policy of Truth"
 "Enjoy the Silence"
 "Clean"
 "Halo"
 "World in My Eyes"

All songs were written by Martin L. Gore
All videos were directed by Anton Corbijn

References

External links
 

Depeche Mode video albums
1990 video albums
Music video compilation albums
1990 compilation albums